Uchugan-Asanovo (Ösögän-Äsän) is a rural locality (a village) in Buzatovsky Selsoviet, Sterlibashevsky District, Bashkortostan, Russia. The population was 264 as of 2010. There are 2 streets.

Geography 
Uchugan-Asanovo is located 51 km southwest of Sterlibashevo (the district's administrative centre) by road. Buzat is the nearest rural locality.

References 

Rural localities in Sterlibashevsky District